Gynnidomorpha minimana, the fen conch, is a moth of the family Tortricidae. The species was first described by Aristide Caradja in 1916. It is found in China (Hebei, Heilongjiang, Jianxi, Jilin, Yunnan), Taiwan, Japan, Korea, Russia and Europe, where it has been recorded from Ireland, Great Britain, the Netherlands, Italy, France, Germany, Denmark, Norway, Sweden, Finland, Estonia, Latvia, Lithuania, Slovakia, Poland, Romania, Hungary, Albania and Corsica. The habitat consists of heathland and mosses.

The wingspan is 11–15 mm. The forewings are reddish brown with some lighter patterns at the dorsal edge, rounded at the tip.
Adults are on wing from June to July.

The larvae feed on Pedicularis palustris. They feed within the flowers and seedheads of their host plant.

References

External links
lepiforum.de

Moths described in 1916
Cochylini